Ariana Kelly (born December 7, 1976) is an American politician from Maryland and a member of the Democratic Party. She is a member of the Maryland Senate in District 16, and was previously a member of the Maryland House of Delegates representing District 16 from 2011 to 2023, which is located in Montgomery County.

Education and professional background
Ariana Kelly grew up in Bethesda where she attended Walter Johnson High School. Kelly also attended the University of Wisconsin-Madison where she studied History, Women's Studies, and TV/Film Production.

Kelly has an extensive background in nonprofit management, media, and social service. In her early career, she worked at Travelers Aid International, Girls Inc, and Legal Momentum. Brannigan Kelly also produced PBS’ To The Contrary, a weekly news program. She covered a wide range of issues including state and federal legislation, business, education, health, and the environment. She specialized in the perspective of underrepresented populations including women and minorities.

Kelly also served as Executive Director at NARAL Pro-Choice Maryland where she led a nationally recognized campaign to investigate crisis pregnancy centers, and published The Truth Revealed Report. Kelly also served as a Campaign Director for MomsRising.org where she worked on Healthcare Reform, Paid Family Leave, Pay Equity, Environmental Health, and Childcare.

Personal life
Kelly is married with two children and two step-children. She is the granddaughter of Maryland fire safety pioneer Francis Brannigan. Kelly's brother, Jonathan Blum, and sister-in-law Kate Orman are Australian science fiction authors.

Kelly's daughter Maeve is the Chair of Maryland High School Democrats, and received press  for her advocacy for including consent in sex education.

In 2015, Kelly was charged with indecent exposure and trespassing in an incident related to a domestic dispute.

Awards and honors

 Maryland Hospital Association Legislator of the Year 2022
 Maryland Nurses Association Legislator of the Year 2021
 Legislative All Star Award, Maryland Retailers Association 2018
 Legislator of the Year, Maryland Psychological Association 2017
 Legislator of the Year award from the Mental Health Association of Maryland 
 Pat on the Back award from Pathfinders for Autism 
 Children's Advocacy Champion from Children's National Medical Center 
 Young Woman of Achievement Award from the Women's Information Network. 
 Spirit Award for Humanitarian Leadership from National Center for Children and Families 
 Community Advocate Award from The Treatment and Learning Centers 
 Certificate of Excellence from Youth for National Change
 Spirit of Service Award from Healthy Teen Network 
 Choice Advocate of the Year Award 2015 and 2016 from NARAL Pro-Choice Maryland
 Scull Award for Community Service, Village of Friendship Heights
 Public Policy Leadership Award from Wonders Child Care 
 Women Legislators of Maryland 2018 Legislative Champion Award
Legislative Achievement Award from MD National Organization of Women

In the legislature
Delegate Kelly serves as the Vice Chair of the Health and Government Operations Committee where she Chairs the Health Occupations and Long Term Care Subcommittee. She is also the House Chair for the Joint Committee on Children, Youth, and Families.

Kelly preciously served as Chair of the Economic Development Committee for Montgomery County and former Democratic Caucus Chair of the Montgomery County House Delegation. In addition, Kelly is the past President of Women Legislators of Maryland.

Kelly was the lead sponsor and floor leader for Maryland's Abortion Care Access Act which modernized Maryland's abortion law in advance of the Supreme Court decision overruling Roe vs Wade.

Kelly was the lead sponsor of Maryland's Contraceptive Equity Act which made Maryland first in the nation for ensuring access to birth control. This legislation required over-the-counter insurance coverage for Emergency Contraception, no cost-sharing for vasectomies, and six-month dispensing for birth control pills, in addition to expanding the types of contraception available to Medicaid and insured populations in Maryland at no cost.

Kelly was also the lead sponsor of legislation that established insurance network adequacy standards in Maryland.

Kelly is House Chair of the Task Force to Study Family and Medical Leave Insurance.

Kelly is leading the fight to strengthen Maryland’s child care subsidy program. She was the lead sponsor of legislation to analyze the program's low reimbursement rates and her work on the Joint Committee on Children, Youth, and Families led to successful legislation mandating increased funding levels.

Kelly has a 100% lifetime rating from the Maryland League of Conservation Voters on their environmental scorecard for legislators.

In December 2022, Governor-elect Wes Moore nominated state senator Susan C. Lee to serve as the Maryland Secretary of State. Kelly filed to fill the vacancy left by Lee in the Maryland Senate in January 2023. Kelly won the nomination by a vote of 24-0 with one abstention. She was sworn in on February 27, 2023.

Legislative notes
 Lead sponsor for House Bill 251, providing for the teaching of consent education in Maryland's Family Life and Human Sexuality Curriculum
 Lead sponsor of House Bill 1342, reforming the Maryland General Assembly's sexual harassment policy and making sexual harassment by lobbyists illegal
 Lead House sponsor for House Bill 775, providing Maryland state employees with 12 weeks of paid parental leave
 Lead sponsor for House Bill 1283, requiring insurance companies to cover up to 12 months of birth control at a time 
 Co-Sponsor for House Bill 1325, banning fracking in Maryland
 Lead sponsor for House Bill 1127, clarifying insurance coverage requirements for substance use disorder and mental health benefits in commercial health plans
 Lead sponsor of House Bill 1026, providing job protected parental leave at the birth or adoption of a child for those working at small businesses, who were not previously covered under the federal Family and Medical Leave Act
 Lead sponsor of House Bill 963, makes obtaining access to forensic medical services easier for sexual assault survivors
 Lead sponsor of House Bill 1191, requiring labeling of Genetically Modified Organisms (GMOs) in raw and packaged food
 Lead sponsor of HB 798, provides parents of children with disabilities access information on habilitative services, including the Parents' Guide to Habilitative Services
 Lead Sponsor on bill to expand insurance coverage for speech therapy, occupational therapy, and physical therapy for young adults with birth defects including cerebral palsy and autism. (HB 235)
 Authored bill to establish a Green Chemistry Task Force in Maryland's Department of Business and Economic Development (HB 811).
 Lead Co-Sponsor for House Bill 235 in 2011, regarding preventing discrimination in housing and employment based on gender identity or expression
 Co-Sponsor for House Bill 175 in 2011, regarding marriage equality

References

External links
Ariana Kelly at delegatearianakelly.com

1976 births
Living people
21st-century American politicians
21st-century American women politicians
Democratic Party Maryland state senators
People from Bethesda, Maryland
University of Wisconsin–Madison College of Letters and Science alumni
Women state legislators in Maryland